Stormcrow or storm crow may refer to:
 Yellow-billed cuckoo, a species of bird
 Gandalf, also called Stormcrow by Théoden, King of Rohan, in Tolkien's legendarium
 Stormcrow (album), a 2015 album by Cain's Offering
 Stormcrow, member of the British metal band Desecration
 Nomenclature of the title 'Stormcrow' may refer to prophetic soothesayers/oneiromancers like Mother Shipton and Nostrodamus.
 Stormcrow (Ryoken), an omnimech weighting 55 tons in the Battletech universe